Ron Sharp is a former teacher and tennis coach from Shawnee, Oklahoma and was a Republican member of the Oklahoma Senate from the 17th district.

Career
While in the Oklahoma Senate, Ron Sharp was one of the first legislators to question Epic Charter Schools spending and filed legislation to regulate them. The legislation was not heard by committee and Sharp was removed from the Senate Education Committee. Epic Charter Schools later attempted to sue Sharp, but the case was dismissed. Sharp lost re-election in 2020 after the founders of Epic Charter Schools spent tens of thousands of dollars in opposition to his re-election campaign.

References

External links
Official page

Living people
Republican Party Oklahoma state senators
American tennis coaches
Date of birth missing (living people)
People from Shawnee, Oklahoma
21st-century American politicians
1952 births